Anasterias antarctica, commonly called the Cinderella starfish, is a species of starfish in the family Asteriidae. It is found in coastal waters in the Southern Ocean and around Antarctica.

Description

Distribution and habitat
Anasterias antarctica is found in the Southern Ocean and the waters around Antarctica. It is native to Argentina, the Falkland Islands and southern Chile, and several islands in the Southern Ocean.

Ecology
A. antarctica is a predator and scavenger. Its diet includes isopods (Sphaeromatidae), gastropod molluscs including Pareuthria spp., bivalve molluscs, chitons and barnacles. Larger starfish take larger prey. It is the dominant predator in the tidal and shallow subtidal zones of the Falkland Islands.

A study of the community in the Beagle Channel associated with the giant kelp Macrocystis pyrifera showed A. antarctica as being at the top trophic level, feeding on the herbivores grazing on the seaweed, on the filter feeders, on the other predators in the community and on the detritivores.

Breeding takes place between March and July, with the developing embryos being brooded by the parent. Fecundity ranges between 52 and 363 eggs and the highest proportion of females are brooding during May and June. The adult feeds most intensely before and after the brooding period but fasts while brooding; however, adults that are brooding a small number of embryos sometimes feed while brooding. The juveniles are released between September and November, larger ones departing first while smaller ones remain.

References

Asteriidae
Fauna of the Southern Ocean
Starfish described in 1857
Taxa named by Christian Frederik Lütken